Carles Delclaux Is (born 1951, Sant Cugat del Vallès) is a textile artist trained in the Aymat factory and in the Massana School of Fine Arts in Barcelona.

Career
From 1970 to 1974 he directed the Catalan School of Tapestry In 1975 he moved to Girona, where he held a chair in tapestry, teaching the craft of weaver based on academicism.

He has recreated works of many artists, reinterpreting: Josep Grau-Garriga , Joan-Josep Tharrats, Josep Maria Subirachs, Joan Miró, Manuel Millares, José Beulas, Modest Cuixart, Pere Lloses, Domènec Fita, Narcís Comadira, Juan José Torralba, Francesc Torres i Monsó, Marcel Martí and others. His own designs evolve tapestry for a renaissance in the third millennium.

His work is part of the collections of museums such as MACBA, CDAN, Contemporary Tapestry Museum-Casa Aymat, CDMT and others, as well as private collections and public institutions.

Bibliography 
 BORRÀS, Maria Lluïsa (1991). Delclaux, Artista i Mestre del Tapís. (in Catalan). Girona, edit: Col·legi Oficial d'Aparelladors i Arquitectes Tècnics de Girona. 
 (1992). Tharrats, tapissos 1989-1992. (in Catalan). Barcelona, edit: Parsifal Edicions. 
 (2005). Alt lliç. Col·lecció d'art contemporani. (in Catalan). Girona, Ajuntament de Girona. 
 MIRALLES, Francesc and SANJUAN, Roser (2009). De la Sombra a la Luz. Tapices catalanes, de Picasso a Grau-Garriga. (in Spanish). De l'Ombre à la Lumière. Tapisseries catalanes, de Picasso à Grau-Garriga. (in French). Sant Cugat and Angers, edit: Museu de Sant Cugat and Musée Jean Lurçat et de la tapisserie contemporaine. 
 MIRALLES, Francesc (2010). Escola catalana de tapís: el tapís contemporani català. (in Catalan). Sant Cugat, Terrassa and Angers, edit: Museu de Sant Cugat, Centre Cultural Caixa Terrassa and Musée Jean Lurçat et de la tapisserie contemporaine. 
 DE LA CALLE VIAN, Laura (2013). La edad de plata de la tapicería española. (in Spanish). Madrid, edit: Fundación Universitaria Española.

External links 
  Carles Delclaux Facebook
  Carles Delclaux Twitter
  Carles Delclaux Wikiart

Gallery

References 

Tapestry artists
1951 births
Artists from Catalonia
Living people